The Clevedon Mercury was a broadsheet paid for newspaper delivered to homes in the North Somerset area of southwestern England. It was founded in 1863 to communicate national news and local happenings. It became a tabloid newspaper in the mid eighties and a free publication sometime in the 1990s. The final issue was published in April 2012.

External links
 Clevedon Mercury

Northcliffe Media
Newspapers published in Somerset
Clevedon